Purba Rgyal (born July 8, 1985), also known as Pu Bajia, is a Chinese singer and actor of Tibetan ethnicity.

Life

Early life
Purba Rgyal was born on July 8, 1985, in Jinchuan County, Ngawa Tibetan and Qiang Autonomous Prefecture, Sichuan province. In 2007 he graduated from Shanghai Theatre Academy, majoring in acting.

Career
During his university period, he began participating in entertainment programs.

On August 26, 2006, Purba Rgyal won the championship in Dragon Television's Come On! Good Guys!.

For his role as Rameau Laudun in Prince of the Himalaya, he won a Golden Angel Award at the 3rd Los Angeles International Film Festival in 2007, and a Best Actor Award at the 6th Monaco International Film Festival in 2008.

His debut solo album, Love Is So Simple, was released on December 15, 2008.

Personal life
In February 2018, Purba Rgyal got engaged to actress Liang Jie.
But in May 2021 they had announced their peaceful breakup.

Filmography

Film

Television

Discography

Studio album

Singles

Film and TV awards

Music awards

References

External links
 
 
 Purba Rgyal at chinesemov.com

21st-century Tibetan male singers
1985 births
Male actors from Sichuan
Living people
Shanghai Theatre Academy alumni
Chinese male film actors
Chinese male television actors
21st-century Chinese male singers